Elliot Lake is a city in Algoma District, Ontario, Canada. It is north of Lake Huron, midway between the cities of Sudbury and Sault Ste. Marie in the Northern Ontario region. Once dubbed the "uranium capital of the world," Elliot Lake has since diversified to a hub for forest harvesting, mine reclamation expertise, and advanced manufacturing. Elliot Lake is now known as a place for affordable retirement living, waterfront cottage lots and as a four-season destination.

History
Prior to the settlement of the city, a seasonal Ojibwa village extended along the lake's shoreline near the present hospital.

The town takes its name from the lake. There is no official record of origin of name; the earliest appearance is on the Dominion map of 1901. Folklore suggest it was named for a logging camp cook who drowned in the lake. The townsite name was approved on August 14, 1952. Elliot Lake was incorporated as a city in 1990.

Uranium mining

The city was established as a planned community for the mining industry in 1955 after the discovery of uranium in the area, and named after the small lake on its northern edge. By the late 1950s, its population had grown to about 25,000. It was originally incorporated as an improvement district. Geologist Franc Joubin and American financier Joseph Hirshhorn were instrumental in its founding. The principal mining companies were Denison Mines and Rio Algom. The population has varied with several boom-and-bust cycles from the 1950s to the 1990s, from a high of over 26,000 to a low of about 6,600.

By 1958 it was apparent that world production of uranium was far outstripping demand and Canadian producers received unofficial notice that US options on Canadian uranium production between 1962 and 1966 would not be exercised. This was confirmed in 1959.

During the 1970s, federal plans for CANDU Reactors and Ontario Hydro's interest in atomic energy led the town, anticipating a population of 30,000, to expand again. However, by the early 1990s depleted reserves and low prices caused the last mines in the area to close.

Area uranium mines
 Stanleigh Mine (1956–1960 and 1982–1997), operated by Rio Algom Ltd., produced 14 million tons of ore.
 Spanish American Mine (1957–1959), operated by Rio Algom Ltd., produced 79,000 tons of ore.
 Can-Met Mine (1957–1960), operated by Denison Mines Ltd., produced 2.6 million tons of ore.
 Milliken Mine (1957–1964), operated by Rio Algom Ltd., produced 6.3 million tons of ore.
 Panel Mine (1957–1961 and 1978–1990), operated by Rio Algom Ltd., produced 15 million tons of ore.
 Denison Mine (1957–1992), operated by Denison Mines Ltd., produced 69 million tons of ore.
 Stanrock Mine (1958–1960 and 1964–1985), operated by Denison Mines Ltd., produced 6.4 million tons of ore.
 Quirke Mine(s) (1955–1961 and 1965–1990), operated by Rio Algom Ltd., produced 44 million tons of ore.
 Pronto Mine (1955–1970), operated by Rio Algom Ltd., produced 2.3 million tons of ore.
 Buckles Mine (1956–1960), operated by Rio Algom Ltd., produced 276,000 tons of ore.
 Lacnor Mine "Lake Nordic" (1956–1960), operated by Rio Algom Ltd., produced 3.4 million tons of ore.
 Nordic Mine (1956–1970), operated by Rio Algom Ltd., produced 13 million tons of ore

Mining legacy health and environmental concerns

In 1974, after growing concern from uranium miners about lung cancer and a lack of support from mine owners for sick workers, 1,000 uranium miners staged a wildcat strike. The 14-day strike triggered a chain of events that led to the creation of a Royal Commission on the Health and Safety of Workers in Mines (informally known as the Ham Commission)  which subsequently led to the creation of the Canada's Occupational Health and Safety Act of 1979.

According to University of Toronto history professor Laurel Sefton MacDowell in her 2012 article 'The Elliot Lake Uranium Miners’ Battle to Gain Occupational Health and Safety Improvements, 1950–1980', the health concerns over radiation in the local environment are perpetual, and must be monitored perpetually.

The 2017 performance of Rio Algom Limited (a subsidiary of BHP), who own nine of the decommissioned mines, was described as "below expectations" by the Canadian Nuclear Safety Commission. Canadian Nuclear Safety Commission reported radium releases above limits at the Stanleigh effluent treatment plant, prompting engineering work plus increased site monitoring by the owners.

Post-mining
In the years following the cessation of mining, the city looked elsewhere for its survival, finding some success promoting itself as a retirement community, advanced manufacturing hub and tourist destination. 

On June 23, 2012, part of a roof collapsed at Algo Centre Mall, sending metal and concrete debris crashing down through two floors of the shopping centre. The accident killed two people. Pearson Plaza has since opened.

On February 21, 2019, part of the theatre roof of the Lester B. Pearson Civic Centre collapsed due to an abnormally heavy snow load.  The building has since been completely demolished.

Today, the economy of Elliot Lake has seen steady growth. Major employers in Elliot Lake include major mining services firms such as Komatsu, Weir, and Denison Environmental; specialty manufacturing organizations such as St. Regis Group, HiRail Leasing and Prestige Pulpits; numerous forestry businesses; a collection of professional services offices such as Cambridge Law LLP, KPMG and BrokerLink and an increasing number of technology organizations. Government organizations found in the community are numerous and include the City of Elliot Lake, Elliot Lake Retirement Living, a range of Ontario Ministries, a set of federal government offices, a hospital, many health service providers and several schools.

The city boasts a strong number of developers, wedding venues, and a range of shops and services servicing the surrounding cottage country. 

The city has four major retail areas: Downtown, Highway 108 Corridor, Hillside, and Paris; and two industrial parks, located at north and south ends of the City. The new mall is Pearson Plaza, and opened downtown in 2016. The retail core hosts most large Canadian chains with some specialty stores.

In January 2023, just weeks after being elected in the 2022 Algoma District municipal elections, mayor Chris Patrie was removed from office in a ruling that he had violated municipal conflict of interest rules by lobbying, in his prior term as a city councillor, to have the city's new recreation centre built near the Oakland Plaza, in which he is a part owner, instead of on the former Algo Centre Mall site. The city has not yet officially announced how it will fill the vacancy; deputy mayor Andrew Wannan is currently serving as acting mayor, while Patrie has appealed the ruling.

Geography and environment

Situated on the Canadian Shield, the city is surrounded by dense forest, muskeg swamps, numerous lakes, winding rivers, and hills of Precambrian bedrock. The local forests are mixed deciduous and coniferous, with colourful displays in the autumn.

Local wildlife include moose, white-tailed deer, American black bear, beaver, loon, muskrat, otter, Canada goose, and lynx, to name but a few. Fish species include lake trout, speckled trout, rainbow trout, smallmouth bass, pickerel (walleye), and sturgeon.

Since December 1990 the town has been home to the Elliot Lake Research Field Station, established by Laurentian University to investigate environmental radioactivity.

Acclaimed Canadian photographer Edward Burtynsky has taken landscape pictures of uranium and nickel tailings during the mid-1990s, providing evidence of the after-effects to the ecosystem.

Climate
Elliot Lake has a humid continental climate (Dfb). Summers are warm and rainy with cool nights. Winters are long and very cold with extremely heavy snowfall. Precipitation is very heavy year round for such a cold location.

Demographics

Transportation

Relatively isolated, Elliot Lake is connected to the south only by Highway 108, a 30 km distance to Highway 17, also known as the Trans-Canada Highway. North of the city, Highway 639 extends for 24 kilometres to its terminus at Highway 546, an almost entirely unpopulated route used primarily as an access road to Mississagi Provincial Park and a few private wilderness recreation lodges. The Deer Trail Route, a part of the Ontario Tourist Route network, follows a circle consisting of Highways 17, 108, 639 and 546.

A 1991 study by the Ontario Ministry of Transportation proposed the extension of Highway 555 (Granary Lake Road) from Blind River to meet Spine Road in Elliot Lake, creating a new route which would reduce the length of a commute between the two communities by approximately 20 kilometres. Although the ministry has announced no firm plans to construct the proposed road, Elliot Lake City Council passed a motion in August 2015 calling for the project's revival.

As a general aviation facility Elliot Lake Municipal Airport has no regularly scheduled flights. The closest scheduled airport with flights are located in Sudbury and Sault Ste. Marie.

Elliot Lake Transit provides hourly bus service except on Sundays and statutory holidays.

Intercity motor coach service is provided by Ontario Northland.

Arts and culture
Local festivals include the Jewel in the Wilderness Festival, Heritage Weekend and the Elliot Lake Arts on the Trail festival.

The city is home to Denison House, a hotel and convention facility located in the former corporate lodge of Denison Mines, and the Elliot Lake Mining and Nuclear Museum. Two community monuments, the Uranium Atom Monument downtown and the Miners Memorial Monument on Horne Lake, are also found in the city, as well as a scenic lookout at the former fire tower.

In 1975, Canadian musician Stompin' Tom Connors recorded "Damn Good Song for a Miner," about the city of Elliot Lake and its mining culture in the 1960s. Elliot Lake is also a prominent setting in Alistair MacLeod's award-winning novel No Great Mischief.

Tourist attractions

 The Elliot Lake fire tower lookout overlooks the city.
 Mount Dufour – Ski area with 2 lifts and 7 trails,  vertical and 100% snowmaking capability
 Elliot Lake Nuclear and Mining Museum / Canadian Mining Hall of Fame

Education

Current schools
 Elliot Lake Secondary School
 Villa Française-des-Jeunes
 Our Lady of Fatima
 Our Lady of Lourdes
 École Georges-Vanier
 Esten Park Public School
 Central Avenue Public School

Defunct postsecondary and adult schools
 Sault College (Satellite Campus) – closed
 Collège Boréal (Satellite Campus) – replaced with Access Centre to assist locals in finding employment
 White Mountain Academy of the Arts – closed 2006

Sports
 Elliot Lake ATV Club
 Stone Ridge Golf & Country Club
 Mount Dufour Ski Area
 OK Tire North Shore Challenge Drag Race
 Mountain Bike Ontario Cup Race
 The Jewel in the Wilderness Ontario Cup Road Race
 Tri-it in the Wilderness Triathlon
 Bell Ididarace Sled Dog Race
 Deer Trail Scenic Touring Route
 Elliot Lake Tennis Club
 Voyageur Hiking Trail

Hockey
 Elliot Lake Wildcats/Red Wings (NOJHL) 2014–present
 Elliot Lake Bobcats (GMJHL/NOJHL) 2007–2014
 Elliot Lake Vikings (NOJHL) 1965–1999
 Elliot Lake Contractors (GNML) 1986–1992
 Elliot Lake Minor Hockey Association
 Elliot Lake Major Hockey Association

Baseball
 Elliot Lake Fireside Heat
 Elliot Lake Minor Fastball Association

Martial Arts
 Korean Martial Arts Centre (KMAC)

Softball
 Elliot Lake Mixed Slow-pitch (Adult)
 Elliot Lake Mixed Slow-pitch (Youth)

Swimming
 Elliot Lake Aquatic Club (ELAC)

Media

Online media
ElliotLakeToday.com is an online local news source in Elliot Lake, offering the latest breaking news, weather updates, entertainment, sports and business features, obituaries and more.

Print media
The Elliot Lake Standard is the city's newspaper, owned by Postmedia.

The North Shore Bulletin is the city's bi-weekly advertising flyer, which also prints current news events.

Radio
Elliot Lake has one commercial radio station, which operates two transmitters due to signal deficiencies in parts of the city. All of its other radio services are rebroadcasters of stations from Sudbury.

Television

Elliot Lake was previously served by CBEC-TV, VHF channel 7, and CBLFT-TV-6, VHF channel 12, which rebroadcast the Toronto-based stations CBLT-DT (CBC Television) and CBLFT-DT (Ici Radio-Canada Télé), respectively. These rebroadcasters were shut down in 2012 due to budget cuts at the Canadian Broadcasting Corporation.

People from Elliot Lake
 Rick Brebant, hockey player
 Kayt Burgess, writer
 Catharine Dixon, writer
 Christine Girard, weightlifter
 Alex Henry, hockey player
 Jeremy Stevenson, hockey player
 Zack Stortini, hockey player
 Alan Thicke, late Canadian-American actor moved from Kirkland Lake and grew up in Elliot Lake

See also
List of francophone communities in Ontario
Algo Centre Mall#2012 roof collapse
1974 Elliot Lake miners strike

References

External links

 
Cities in Ontario
Mining communities in Ontario
Planned cities in Canada
Single-tier municipalities in Ontario